Northern Tallgrass Prairie National Wildlife Refuge was established to provide a means of working with individuals, groups, private organizations, and government entities to permanently preserve a portion of the remaining remnant tracts of northern tallgrass prairie in Minnesota and Iowa. The United States Fish and Wildlife Service is acquiring remnant prairie tracts for the refuge in both easement and fee title interests from willing sellers.

The 8 units owned by the US Fish Wildlife Service account for nearly 3,000 acres (2,451 acres in Minnesota and 352 acres in Iowa). Field administration of all units acquired for the refuge will occur from eight existing Fish and Wildlife Service Wetland Management District and National Wildlife Refuge offices scattered throughout the project area established for the refuge.

When a tract of land is acquired for the refuge within the work area for one of these offices, the office will assume administrative authority for the tract. The project leader of Big Stone National Wildlife Refuge is responsible for overseeing the administration of the entire refuge.

Touch the Sky Prairie

Touch the Sky Prairie is one unit of the Northern Tall Grass Prairie National Wildlife Refuge. Touch the Sky Prairie was created in 2001 and is located in Rock County, Minnesota a few short miles west of Blue Mounds State Park. This remnant tall grass prairie consists of approximately 1,000 acres of native prairie grasses, wildflowers, several bird species, and a small segment of Beaver Creek.  A trail approximately 1 mile in length leads through beautiful wildflowers and a secluded waterfall.

Prairie Smoke
The Prairie Smoke Unit is located South-East of Algona, Iowa in Kossuth County. This remnant prairie unit is utilized by waterfowl hunters during hunting season. Prairie Smoke was purchased by the US Fish and Wildlife Service in 2002.

References
Refuge website

National Wildlife Refuges in Minnesota
National Wildlife Refuges in Iowa
Protected areas established in 2000
2000 establishments in Iowa
2000 establishments in Minnesota
Grasslands of the North American Great Plains